Eternal Sunshine of the Spotless Mind is a 2004 American science fiction romantic drama film written by Charlie Kaufman, directed by Michel Gondry, and starring Jim Carrey and Kate Winslet. Pierre Bismuth created the story with Kaufman and Gondry. The film features an ensemble supporting cast that includes Kirsten Dunst, Mark Ruffalo, Elijah Wood, and Tom Wilkinson. The title of the film is a quotation from the 1717 poem Eloisa to Abelard by Alexander Pope. The picture uses elements of psychological drama, science fiction and a nonlinear narrative to explore the nature of memory and romantic love.

Eternal Sunshine of the Spotless Mind was released in the United States on March 19, 2004, receiving universal acclaim from critics and audiences, praising the plot, screenplay, Gondry's direction, visual style, editing, musical score, themes, and the performances, specifically Carrey and Winslet. The film was a box office success, grossing $74 million worldwide. It won the Academy Award for Best Original Screenplay, and Winslet received a nomination for the Academy Award for Best Actress. The film developed a cult following in the years after its release and has come to be regarded by many critics as one of the best films of the 2000s, and one of the greatest romance films of all time. Eternal Sunshine of the Spotless Mind was named by the American Film Institute one of 2004's Top 10 Films.

Plot
After a fight, Joel Barish discovers that his girlfriend Clementine Kruczynski has had her memories of him erased by the New York City firm Lacuna. Heartbroken, he decides to undergo the same procedure. In preparation, he records a tape for Lacuna, recounting his memories of their volatile relationship.

The Lacuna employees work on Joel's brain as he sleeps in his apartment so that he will wake up with no memory of the procedure. One employee, Patrick, leaves to see Clementine; since her procedure, he has been using Joel's and Clementine's memories as a guide for seducing her. While the procedure runs on Joel's brain, technician Stan and secretary Mary party and have sex.

Joel re-experiences his memories of Clementine as they are erased, starting with their last fight. As he reaches earlier, happier memories, he realizes that he does not want to forget her. His mental projection of Clementine suggests that Joel hide her in memories that do not involve her. This halts the procedure, but Stan calls his boss, Howard, who arrives and restarts it. Joel comes to his last remaining memory of Clementine: the day they first met, on a beach in Montauk. As the memory crumbles around them, Clementine tells Joel to meet her in Montauk.

In Joel's apartment, while Stan is outside, Mary tells Howard she is in love with him and they kiss. Howard's wife arrives, and, from the street, sees them through the window. Furious, she tells Howard to tell Mary the truth: that Mary and Howard previously had an affair, and that Mary had her memories erased. Disgusted, Mary steals the Lacuna records and mails them to the patients, including Joel and Clementine.

Joel wakes up, his memories of Clementine erased. He impulsively goes to Montauk and meets Clementine on the train home. They are drawn to each other and go on a date to the frozen Charles River in Boston. Joel drives Clementine home and Patrick sees them, realizing they have found each other again. Joel and Clementine receive their Lacuna records and listen to their tapes. They are shocked by the bitter memories they had of each other, and almost separate a second time, but agree to try again.

Cast 
 Jim Carrey as Joel Barish: A bookish introvert who enters a two-year relationship with Clementine Kruczynski. After their relationship ends, Clementine erases Joel from her memory, and he erases her from his mind in response. Charlie Kaufman depicted Joel with some of his autobiographical personality traits. Producers cast Carrey against type for his role as Joel, selecting him for his everyday appearance, as well as his comedic ability. According to Gondry, this was because "It's hard to be funny. It's far easier to take someone really funny and bring them down than do the opposite." To induce Carrey, an actor who typically portrayed high-energy roles, to portray a restrained character, Gondry would not allow him to improvise, a restriction he did not place on the other cast members (Carrey objected). Gondry also put Carrey off balance by giving misleading orders or by rolling the camera at the wrong time. Gondry believed this would make Carrey forget what he should do to be Joel, allowing him to go in character. In the 2017 Netflix documentary Jim & Andy, Carrey mentions a conversation with Gondry one year before shooting began for Eternal Sunshine of the Spotless Mind, shortly after Carrey had a breakup with an unspecified woman. Gondry saw that Carrey's emotional state at the time was "so beautiful, so broken" that he asked him to stay that way for one year to fit the character. In the documentary, Carrey commented, "That's how fucked up this business is." Nicolas Cage was Gondry's original choice to play Joel, but Cage was unavailable as he was in high demand from independent directors after his performance in Leaving Las Vegas.
 Kate Winslet as Clementine Kruczynski: A spontaneous extrovert who, after breaking up with him after a two-year relationship, erases Joel Barish from her mind. Producers cast Winslet against type for her part as Clementine, as Winslet had previously featured heavily in period pieces. She received the role after she was the only actress to offer criticism on the script instead of pandering to the writers. After another actress won an Oscar, the studio attempted to make Gondry use her instead of Winslet for the role of Clementine, but Gondry threatened to walk from the project if that occurred. During filming, Gondry took Winslet to a separate room to coach her, and she wore wigs instead of dying her hair. Some commentators note how Clementine's character criticizes the Manic Pixie Dream Girl stock character several years before film critic Nathan Rabin coined the phrase. Most commentators discuss one particular example to demonstrate this criticism, wherein Clementine warns Joel she is flawed: "Too many guys think I'm a concept, or I complete them, or I'm gonna make them alive. But I'm just a fucked-up girl who's looking for my own peace of mind. Don't assign me yours." With her impulsiveness, emotional intensity (extreme mood changes), alcohol dependence, turbulent relationships, reckless behavior, and hasty idealization or devaluation of Joel, Clementine seems to exhibit traits of borderline personality disorder, although it is not clear whether Kaufman wrote her character with this specific diagnosis in mind. Gondry had earlier thought of casting Björk for the role of Clementine. She feared she would be emotionally affected and rejected the invitation after reading the script.
 Kirsten Dunst as Mary Svevo: The receptionist for Lacuna who, while dating Stan Fink, has a crush on Howard Mierzwiak. While erasing Joel's memory, Howard's wife catches her kissing Howard. Howard's wife reveals Mary previously had a relationship with Howard, which Howard erased from her mind. She reacts to this information by quitting her job and mailing Lacuna's company records to its customers. In the script, Mary and Howard's relationship resulted in an unplanned pregnancy, leading to Howard pressuring Mary into an abortion, which Howard also erased from her memory.
 Mark Ruffalo as Stan Fink: A technician for Lacuna who is in a relationship with Mary Svevo until the reveal of her previous relationship with Howard Mierzwiak. Ruffalo received the role of Stan after providing an "unexpected take on the role" to Gondry when he suggested Stan be a fan of the Clash and resemble Joe Strummer.
 Elijah Wood as Patrick Wertz: Patrick is a technician for Lacuna who enters a relationship with Clementine by imitating Joel. They break up when Joel and Clementine begin dating for the second time. Seth Rogen auditioned for the role.
 Tom Wilkinson as Dr. Howard Mierzwiak: Howard runs Lacuna. Before the film's events, he had an affair with Mary, which ended with the relationship's erasure from her mind. Wilkinson reportedly did not enjoy the shooting of the film and clashed with Gondry.
 Jane Adams as Carrie Eakin: Joel Barish's friend. She is in a troubled relationship with Rob Eakin.
 David Cross as Rob Eakin: Joel Barish's friend. In a troubled relationship with Carrie Eakin.
 Deirdre O'Connell as Hollis Mierzwiak: Howard Mierzwiak's wife
 Thomas Jay Ryan as Frank: Joel Barish's neighbor
 Debbon Ayer as Joel Barish's mother
 Ellen Pompeo as Naomi, Joel Barish's ex (deleted scene)

Production

Development 
The concept of Eternal Sunshine of the Spotless Mind came from conversations between director Michel Gondry and co-writer Pierre Bismuth in 1998. The pair had met and become friends in the early 1980s during Gondry's drumming career in the French pop group Oui Oui. Bismuth had conceived of the idea of erasing certain people from people's minds in response to a friend complaining about her boyfriend; when he asked her if she would erase that boyfriend from her memory, she said yes. Bismuth originally planned to conduct an art experiment involving sending cards to people saying someone they knew had erased the card's recipient from their memory. When he mentioned this to Gondry, they developed it into a story based on the situations that would arise if it were scientifically possible. Bismuth never carried out his experiment idea.

Gondry approached writer Charlie Kaufman with this concept, and they developed it into a short pitch. While the writers did not believe the concept was marketable, a small bidding war began over the idea. Steve Golin of Propaganda Films purchased it on June 12, 1998, for a low seven-figure sum. Kaufman, who was responsible for writing the screenplay, did not begin immediately, instead opting to suspend writing while he was working on Adaptation, Confessions of a Dangerous Mind, and Human Nature, the last of which Gondry directed as his directorial debut.

During this time, filmmaker Christopher Nolan released his film Memento, which similarly deals with memory. Due to the similarities, Kaufman became worried and tried to pull out of the project, but Golin made him complete it. During writing, the pitch's ownership changed several times resulting in Kaufman not having to deal with the studios until the end of the scriptwriting process. The final script made the studios nervous.

Kaufman did not want to make the film a thriller and wanted to downplay the science fiction aspects of memory erasure, focusing on the relationship. He had an "enormous struggle" while writing the script, particularly encountering two problems: showing "the memories, Joel's reactions to the memories, and Joel interacting with Clementine outside of the memories in the memories," and the fact that characters could refer in later scenes to already erased memories.

Kaufman resolved the first problem by making Joel lucid and able to comment on his memories and solved the second by making the memories degrade instead of immediately erasing, with complete erasure occurring at awakening. Kaufman's original name for the screenplay was 18 words long, as he had wanted a title that "you couldn't possibly fit on a marquee." He eventually decided on Eternal Sunshine of the Spotless Mind, a title originating from the 1717 poem Eloisa to Abelard by Alexander Pope.

Filming and post-production 

The shooting of Eternal Sunshine of the Spotless Mind began in mid-January 2003 after six weeks of preparation, lasting for three months on a budget of $20 million mostly in and around New York City. The production crew recreated some key scenes, such as Joel's Rockville Centre apartment and the 1950s-style kitchen, in a New Jersey former U.S. Navy base. The shoot was difficult, sometimes shooting for seventeen hours per day in harsh environments.

The shoot was challenging for cinematographer Ellen Kuras, due to the difficulty of filming Gondry's vision for the film, which aimed to "blend location-shoot authenticity with unpredictable flashes of whimsy". According to this vision, Gondry wanted available light used exclusively for the shoot. Kuras disagreed and worked around this idea by lighting the room instead of the actors and by hiding light bulbs around the set to increase light levels. Another issue the cinematographers encountered was that due to the frequent improvisation, the lack of marks and the few rehearsals completed, the cinematographers often did not know where the actors would be. Two handheld cameras filmed near 360-degree footage at all times, shooting 36,000 feet of film a day to deal with this. Gondry called back to the work of French New Wave director Jean-Luc Godard by filming using wheelchairs as well as using sled and chariot dollies instead of traditional dollies. When using wheelchairs, the shot was not consistently smooth; however, as Kuras liked the aesthetic of the low-angle, wobbly movement, the final film contains the footage.

The film used minimal CGI, with many effects accomplished in-camera, through forced perspectives, hidden space, spotlighting, unsynchronized sound, split focus and continuity editing. A notable example is the ocean washing away the house in Montauk; the production team accomplished this by building the corner of a house on the beach and allowing the tide to rise. Executing this effect was difficult, as the special team hired to place the set in the water refused due to perceived dangers. In response, Gondry fired the team and had the production team, including the actors and producers, place the set in the water. In retaliation for Gondry's actions, the chief of the union reprimanded Gondry in front of the crew.

Kaufman rewrote some of the script during production; thus, several discrepancies exist between the production script and the final film. A fundamental difference is that in the production script, with the erasure of each memory, Clementine's behavior is increasingly robotic. In the final film, Winslet plays Clementine straight, and degradation of settings and the intrusion of settings upon each other establish memory degradation visually. Another script component that did not make it into the final film was the appearance of Naomi, Joel's girlfriend, played by Ellen Pompeo. Against Kaufman's insistence on Naomi's inclusion, the production team cut her already filmed scenes. Tracy Morgan was also cut from the film.

Icelandic editor Valdís Óskarsdóttir edited the film, and she reportedly conflicted with Gondry during editing. Kaufman was also very involved in the editing of the film. Editing was a long process as there was no requirement to rush it. There were a few test screenings of the film, which elicited positive reactions.

Music

The soundtrack album for Eternal Sunshine of the Spotless Mind was composed by Los Angeles musician Jon Brion, also featuring songs from artists including The Polyphonic Spree, The Willowz, and Don Nelson. Hollywood Records released the soundtrack on March 16, 2004. A cover version of The Korgis' "Everybody's Got to Learn Sometime" with instrumentation by Brion and vocals by Beck operates as the soundtrack's centerpiece, setting the film's tone in the opening credits, and closing the film.

Eternal Sunshine of the Spotless Mind's soundtrack received generally positive reviews. AllMusic described it as "nearly as deft", and described Brion's score as "intimate" and "evocative of love and memories". Other positive reviews noted the ambient nature of the music and lauded Beck's cover of "Everybody's Got to Learn Sometime." The soundtrack's detractors criticized the album's lack of identity and its depressive atmosphere. Even among the detractors, the score's ability to mesh with the plot was lauded, an appraisal common to many reviews.

Analysis 

Author Carol Vernallis, writing in Screen, argued that Gondry's experience in directing music videos contributed to the film's mise-en-scène and sound design. Vernallis describes some threads of the visual, aural and musical motifs throughout the film, and how some motifs can work in counterpoint.

Philosopher Christopher Grau, in The Journal of Aesthetics and Art Criticism, discussed how he perceived the film to have its own defined philosophy, beyond addressing ideas of a philosophical nature.

Eternal Sunshine of the Spotless Mind has been aligned with a greater inspection, distinctly related to the 21st century, of memory, longing and nostalgia in science fiction films like Code 46 and 2046. The film showcases memory as fragmented and unreliable, evident by its non-linear structure.

Release

Box office 
Produced on a budget of $20 million, Eternal Sunshine of the Spotless Mind opened on March 19, 2004, in the United States, earning $8,175,198 in its opening weekend in 1,353 theaters. The film placed seventh in the weekend's box office, and remained in theaters for 19 weeks, earning $34,400,301 in the United States and $39,636,414 in international markets for a total of $74,036,715 worldwide. Eternal Sunshine of the Spotless Mind is, Kaufman's most profitable and Gondry's second most profitable film.

Critical response 

On Rotten Tomatoes, the film has an approval rating 92% based on 250 reviews, with an average score of 8.50/10. The site's critical consensus reads, "Propelled by Charlie Kaufman's smart, imaginative script and Michel Gondry's equally daring directorial touch, Eternal Sunshine is a twisty yet heartfelt look at relationships and heartache." On Metacritic, the film has a score of 89 out of 100, based on 41 reviews, indicating "universal acclaim." Audiences polled by CinemaScore gave the film an average grade of "B−" on an A+ to F scale.

Goat Entertainment rated the film a 7.79/10.

Roger Ebert of Chicago Sun-Times in his initial 2004 review gave the film 3½ out of a possible 4. He revisited the film in 2010 when he referred to Kaufman as "the most gifted screenwriter of the 2000s" and revised the rating to a full four stars, adding it to his "Great Movies" list. A. O. Scott of The New York Times praised the film for being "cerebral, formally and conceptually complicated, dense with literary allusions and as unabashedly romantic as any movie you'll ever see". Time Out summed up their review by saying, "the formidable Gondry/Kaufman/Carrey axis works marvel after marvel in expressing the bewildering beauty and existential horror of being trapped inside one's own addled mind, and in allegorising the self-preserving amnesia of a broken but hopeful heart."

Winslet and Carrey received acclaim for their performances. Winslet's performance as Clementine received multiple award nominations, including an Academy Award nomination for Best Actress, a BAFTA nomination for Best Actress in a Leading Role and a Golden Globe Award nomination. Premiere magazine placed her performance 81st in their 2008 list of the 100 Greatest Performances of All Time. Claudia Puig in a review for USA Today said of her performance "Winslet is wonderful as a free spirit whose hair color changes along with her moods. She hasn't had such a meaty role in a while, and she plays it just right".

Ann Hornaday in a review for The Washington Post said "Even when forced to wear costumes and wigs that make her look like Pippi Longstocking after an acid-fueled trip to the thrift market, Winslet maintains a reassuring equilibrium. It takes an actor of her steadiness to play someone this unhinged."

Carrey's performance as Joel also received acclaim and multiple award nominations, including a BAFTA nomination for Best Actor in a Leading Role and a Golden Globe Award nomination. Many reviewers noted his casting against type. Jason Killingsworth in a review for Paste magazine said of his performance "Carrey nails the part, winning audience sympathy from the opening moments of the film".

Moira MacDonald in a review for The Seattle Times stated "[Jim Carrey is] not bad at all — in fact, it's the most honest, vulnerable work he's ever done", while David Edelstein of Slate said "It's rarely a compliment when I refer to an actor as "straitjacketed," but the straitjacketing of Jim Carrey is fiercely poignant. You see all that manic comic energy imprisoned in this ordinary man, with the anarchism peeking out and trying to find a way to express itself." The supporting cast also received acclaim, with several reviews, such as Ann Hornaday of the Washington Post and Rick Groen of The Globe and Mail singling out Ruffalo's performance for praise.

Critics praised Kaufman and his ambition, and he won numerous awards for his efforts, including an Academy Award and a BAFTA for Best Original Screenplay. In Slate, David Edelstein claimed Kaufman had "move[d] the boundary posts of romantic comedy," and Moira MacDonald of The Seattle Times called Kaufman "one of the few creative screenwriters working today." Kaufman's writing also was the recipient of some criticism, with some, including John Powers of the LA Weekly, claiming it lacked passion and Andrew Sarris of Observer criticizing the film's "nonexistent character development."

Gondry, like Kaufman, also received large amounts of praise, with The Washington Post acclaiming "the results [of Gondry using primarily live-action effects], in their intricate detail and execution," as "nothing short of brilliant." The Seattle Times in their review stated "Gondry ... makes it all a melancholy fun house, with camera work and visual tricks that rival the screenplay in invention." Cinematographer Ellen Kuras received praise for her work on the film, such as in a Salon magazine, where, in an overall negative review of the film, reviewer Stephanie Zacharek praised Kuras for her giving "the movie a look of dreamy urgency that's perfect for the story."

Accolades

Home media 

On July 26, 2022, Kino Lorber Studio Classics released Eternal Sunshine of the Spotless Mind on 4K Ultra HD Blu-Ray. This release included a new color grading supervised by cinematographer Ellen Kuras.

Legacy

Television series 
In October 2016, Anonymous Content announced they would be working with Universal Cable Productions to produce a television series based on the film. Kaufman is not involved in writing the show. The project is still in planning stages. As of 2023, it has still not been released, despite six years of work on the script.

Media recognition

See also
 "Eternal Moonshine of the Simpson Mind"
 Everything Everywhere All at Once
 Lucid dream
 Inception
 Act I: Eternal Sunshine (The Pledge)
 List of films considered the best
 Memento
 What Do I Call You

References

External links

 
 
 
 

2004 films
2004 fantasy films
2004 independent films
2004 romantic comedy-drama films
2004 science fiction films
2000s English-language films
2000s fantasy drama films
2000s psychological drama films
2000s romantic fantasy films
2000s science fiction comedy-drama films
American fantasy drama films
American independent films
American nonlinear narrative films
Magic realism films
Metaphysical fiction films
Existentialist films
American psychological drama films
American romantic fantasy films
American science fantasy films
American science fiction comedy-drama films
Anonymous Content films
BAFTA winners (films)
Films about altered memories
Films directed by Michel Gondry
Films produced by Steve Golin
Films scored by Jon Brion
Films set in Long Island
Films set in Manhattan
Films shot in New Jersey
Films shot in New York (state)
Films whose writer won the Best Original Screenplay Academy Award
Films whose writer won the Best Original Screenplay BAFTA Award
Films with screenplays by Charlie Kaufman
Focus Features films
Mad scientist films
2000s American films
Postmodern films
Films about disability